Seán Mahon is an Irish stage and screen actor. He is known for playing Nicky Giblin in the Broadway production of The Seafarer,  Richard Hannay in the Broadway production of The 39 Steps and Michael Hess (the lost son) in the award-winning feature film, Philomena. In 2014 he was nominated for a best lead actor award for his portrayal of maverick cop Brian McGonigle in the Irish drama Red Rock. On 9 July 2018, the BBC announced that Mahon would be joining the cast of EastEnders in 2018 to play Ray Kelly, the ex-husband of Mel Owen.

Filmography

Films

Television

Video games

References

External links

Living people
Irish male film actors
Irish male television actors
Irish male stage actors
Male actors from Dublin (city)
Year of birth missing (living people)